PSR J0855-4644 is a pulsar in the constellation Vela, and could be associated with supernova remnant RX J0852.0-4622 which may have exploded about 1200 years ago.

References

External links
 Simbad

00.7
Vela (constellation)